The 1915–16 season was Stoke's first season in the non-competitive War League.

With the start of World War I, all Football League football was cancelled. In its place were formed War Leagues, based on geographical lines rather than based on previous league placement. Stoke contested the Lancashire Section in the Principal Tournament, and the Southern Division of the Midland Section in the Subsidiary Tournament. However, none of these were considered to be competitive football, and thus their records are not recognised by the Football League.

Season review
With Peter Hodge returning to his family in Scotland former club great, Joe Schofield returned to the club in 1915 as manager for the War-time seasons and with a number of first team players joining the army Stoke fielded a number of 'guest' players as did many other clubs. For the whole war Stoke played in the Lancashire section and in the 1915–16 season ended up in mid-table position of 8th while in the Midland Section Secondary Competition Stoke finished 4th. Stoke's best result was a 7–1 win over Chesterfield Town and guest forward Bob Whittingham was top scorer with 26 goals to his name.

Final league table

Lancashire Section Primary Competition

Midland Section Secondary Competition

Results

Stoke's score comes first

Legend

Lancashire Section Primary Competition

Midland Section Secondary Competition

Squad statistics

References

Stoke City F.C. seasons
Stoke